The Szamotuły–Międzychód railway is a former Polish 57-kilometre long railway line, that connected Szamotuły with Międzychód.

Opening
The line was opened in four stages:

 October 1907: Szamotuły - Binino, Chrzypsko Wielkie - Międzychód  
 April 1908: Binino - Nojewo, Nojewo - Chrzypsko Wielkie

Modernisation
In 1977-1978 a major overhaul of the line took place, including stabilising embankments, replacement of wooden sleepers with concrete sleepers and replacement of the track.

In 2004, the first plans to take over the line from PKP PLK and launch passenger services were announced, but this did not lead to anything. In 2012, a proposal was made to build a cycle route along the course of the railway, but this met negative feedback from residents.

Closure
In 1995, passenger traffic was suspended along the route. Freight services were suspended from 3 May 1996 between Sieraków Wielkopolski and Szamotuły. In later years, freight trains only ran between Sieraków Wielkopolski and Międzychód.

Despite the suspension of traffic on the line in 1996, the railway line remained in the list of railway lines of national importance until 2000.

Usage
In the 1970s, passenger traffic from the station in Sierakowie was about 4,800 people per month, but this steadily decreased to 3,200 people in 1990. Since 2000, the line has occasionally been used for tourist trains using steam engines.

In August 2016, the section between Sieraków Wielkopolski and Lesionkami was used for manual trolley rides.

Gallery

See also 
 Railway lines of Poland

References

 This article is based upon a translation of the Polish language version as of November 2016.

Railway lines in Poland
Railway lines opened in 1907